Jeffrey Tyler Burton (born June 29, 1967), nicknamed The Mayor, is an American former professional stock car racing driver and current racing commentator. He scored 21 career victories in the NASCAR Cup Series, including two Coca-Cola 600s in 1999 and 2001 and the 1999 Southern 500. He currently serves as a color commentator for NBC Sports, having joined them upon their return to their coverage of NASCAR. His son Harrison competes in the NASCAR Cup Series and nephew Jeb Burton currently competes in the NASCAR Xfinity Series, while his brother Ward Burton has also raced in the Cup Series.

Early career
After their father introduced Burton and his brothers to go-kart racing, Burton later moved up to late model stock cars and late models, driving at South Boston Speedway.

NASCAR career

Early career
Burton began driving a handful of races in the Busch Series in 1988 in car number 69 owned by his father John Burton. He competed in the full season for Busch Series Rookie of the Year in 1989 in the No. 12 Burton Autosports Pontiac. In 1990, he drove the No. 12 Armour Lower Salt Bacon-sponsored Buick for Sam Ard, where he won his first career race. Burton and Ard later went to court over financial losses suffered throughout the year. He moved to J&J Racing's No. 99 Armour / Food Lion-sponsored Chevrolet in 1991 for one year before moving on to FILMAR Racing owned by Filbert Martocci where he would drive an Oldsmobile sponsored by TIC Financial Systems in 1992, and a Ford sponsored by Baby Ruth in 1993. Burton would later make his first Winston Cup start in 1993 in car No. 0 owned by Martocci.

FILMAR Racing
Burton ran his first Winston Cup race in 1993 in the No. 0 TIC Financial-sponsored Ford Thunderbird for Fil Martocci.

Stavola Brothers Racing
1994 was Burton's rookie year in the Winston Cup Series, driving the No. 8 Raybestos-sponsored Ford for Stavola Brothers Racing. After five races, he reached a season-high 14th-place finish in the overall standings, but by the end of the year, he dropped to 24th after being disqualified at the Miller Genuine Draft 400 for illegal holes drilled on the roll cage, a safety violation. He had a season-high fourth-place finish on the way to earning 1994 NASCAR Rookie of the Year. He was one of a record-high 10 rookies eligible for the award that year, besting a class that included future Cup stars Joe Nemechek, Jeremy Mayfield, John Andretti, and older brother Ward. The next year, in 1995, Burton had one Top 5, along with a ninth-place finish. He also missed three races and finished 32nd in points.

Roush Racing

In 1996, Burton was signed to Roush Racing, where he began driving the No. 99 Exide Batteries-sponsored Ford Thunderbird. He finished 13th overall in the season points standings despite failing to qualify for the Purolator 500 in March as a new team (provisionals in the first four races were based on 1995 points, and Burton's team did not have points from 1995). His career hit a peak from 1997 to 2000, as he ranked in the top five in points for all four seasons. He achieved his first career win in 1997 in the Interstate Batteries 500 at Texas Motor Speedway (the inaugural NASCAR race at the track), and would go on to win 14 more races during the four-year run. In 1998, the team switched to the new Ford Taurus. In 1999, Burton won a career-high six races, including the Jiffy Lube 300 for a third straight year, and clinched two of the series' four majors: the Coca-Cola 600 and the 50th Annual Southern 500, both of which earned him the No Bull 5 $1 million bonus, which would lead to a fifth-place finish in points. In addition, after winning at Darlington in March, he would lead the point standings for the next five races. His best points finish was in third in 2000, just 294 points behind champion Bobby Labonte. On September 17, 2000, Burton led every lap of the Dura Lube 300 at New Hampshire International Speedway, in unique circumstances (this race was the only Loudon race to use a restrictor plate, imposed for safety reasons after the deaths of Adam Petty and Kenny Irwin Jr. earlier in the year at the track). From 1997 to 2000, Burton won an event at NHIS every year.

In late 2000, Burton and the No. 99 welcomed CITGO as a new sponsor. In 2001 Burton won another two races, upping his career total to 17, and he finished tenth in points, climbing from a season low of 38th, which was his position after four races. In 2002 and 2003, he finished 12th in the points and had eight Top 5s and 25 Top 10s combined, but failed to win a race in either year. CITGO then announced that they were leaving Roush Racing at the end of the 2003 season.

Burton ran the 2004 season without a primary sponsor, with races frequently being sponsored by his personal sponsor SKF.  Rumors began to arise that Burton would be leaving Roush Racing. After originally denying the rumors, it finally happened in mid-2004 when, just before the Sirius at The Glen, Burton signed a three-year contract with Richard Childress Racing (RCR), leaving Roush after eight and a half years with the team.

Richard Childress Racing

No. 30 car
Upon joining RCR, Burton was placed in the No. 30 AOL-sponsored Chevrolet. He was the fourth driver to pilot the car that season; Johnny Sauter was promoted from RCR's Busch Series program to take over the car but was released after 13 races and was replaced by Dave Blaney, with Jim Inglebright making a one race appearance at Sonoma. Blaney was later released when Burton became available. Prior to the driver change, Burton had an average finish of 20.8 and was 23rd in points. In the 13 races after he changed teams, though, the same stats were improved to 16.6 and 18th. During the offseason, Burton and his team remained with RCR but were switched to the No. 31 Cingular Wireless-sponsored Chevy, replacing Robby Gordon. Blaney took his place in the No. 30, which was renumbered to the No. 07.

No. 31 car
2005 was Burton's first full year at RCR, and he had six Top 10s and three Top 5s for the year, including a third-place finish in the Subway Fresh 500 at Phoenix in April and a second-place finish in the Sharpie 500 at Bristol Motor Speedway.

In 2006, Burton won the pole for four races, bringing his total number of career pole wins to six. This poles were for the Daytona 500, the USG Sheetrock 400 at Chicagoland Speedway, the Brickyard 400 at Indianapolis Motor Speedway, and the GFS Marketplace 400 at Michigan International Speedway. Prior to qualifying for the Daytona 500, Burton was extremely enthusiastic about the improvements to RCR as a whole. He proved this by winning his first pole since September 2000 at Richmond. The Allstate 400 pole gave Richard Childress Racing the front row as teammate Clint Bowyer recorded the second fastest time. Burton's best finish came in the Chicagoland race where he recorded a second-place finish. He led the most laps at Indianapolis and Bristol's Sharpie 500, setting the pace for more than half the race. In the Busch Series, he won at Atlanta Motor Speedway and Dover International Speedway, breaking his four-year winless streak in any series. After the race at Richmond International Raceway Jeff qualified for the Chase for the Nextel Cup. During the Chase, Burton won the Dover 400 at Dover International Speedway, breaking a 185-race winless streak dating back to October 28, 2001, allowing him to take the points lead, and retain it for the next three races. However, a series of relatively poor finishes in subsequent races, including a flat tire at Talladega while running in the top five and an engine failure at Martinsville, eliminated Burton from contention for the championship.

Burton won the Samsung 500 at Texas on April 15, 2007, driving with sponsorship from Prilosec OTC, passing former teammate Matt Kenseth on the final lap, making him the first driver to have multiple wins at Texas Motor Speedway. He later went on to qualify for the Chase for the Nextel Cup, he tied for seventh in the 2007 standings.

Burton came very close to winning the 50th annual Daytona 500. He qualified 36th and by the end of the race, he had worked his way up in the field. He led prior to the race's final caution, but when the green flag dropped with four laps to go, lost several positions and wound up finishing 13th.

Burton won the Food City 500 at Bristol Motor Speedway. Following contact between Kevin Harvick and Tony Stewart, Burton passed Harvick and Stewart for second. On the ensuing restart, Burton passed Denny Hamlin coming off of Turn 2 to win the Food City 500 and finishing off a sweep of the podium for Richard Childress Racing. Burton also won the 2008 Bank of America 500 at Lowe's Motor Speedway. Burton took the lead from Greg Biffle with just over 70 laps to go. During the final round of pit stops Burton took fuel only and held off a hard charging Jimmie Johnson for his first multiple win season since 2001.

In 2009, Caterpillar signed on as a sponsor through 2011. Burton was expected to make a run for the championship but a poor season led Burton to miss the Chase for the first time since 2005. Burton's best finish that year was a pair of second-place finishes in the final two races at Phoenix and Homestead, which eventually put him 17th in points.

In 2010, he rebounded but he had still not won a race, though he made the Chase and finished second in both Dover races. He nearly won the fall Martinsville race but a flat tire with 15 laps remaining gave Denny Hamlin the win. A couple weeks later, he and Jeff Gordon got into a wreck long after the caution was out. Burton walked up the track to confront Gordon and the two got into a shoving match. Burton finished 12th in the final points standings. Afterward, Burton assumed responsibility for the incident, stating he was attempting to catch up to Gordon, but was unable to see in the sunlight's glare.

In 2011, Burton was looking for a better season, but a very bad season gave Burton a poor series of finishes. He won the second Gatorade Duel, edging out his Richard Childress Racing teammate Clint Bowyer. After that, Burton's season went downhill from there. He was leading the Daytona 500 halfway when his engine gave out. He nearly won the Coca-Cola 600 but got spun out on the final restart. Though wanting another caution, the yellow flag never came out because NASCAR wanted to see the race finish under green, and Dale Earnhardt Jr. was leading when the accident occurred. His teammate Kevin Harvick passed Earnhardt Jr. within the last 500 yards of the race because Dale Jr. ran out of gas. This led to controversy because fans were speculating that NASCAR wanted Earnhardt to win and go back to victory lane in the first time in three years. Burton's first top 10 came in the twenty first race at Watkins Glen International. Burton missed the 2011 Chase but had a strong run at the fall race at Talladega, leading on the last lap and out of turn four being pushed by Clint Bowyer. At the tri-oval, Bowyer slingshotted to Burton's outside and won by a hood, giving Richard Childress his 100th win as a team owner, Bowyer redeeming his 0.002 second loss to Jimmie Johnson at the track in the spring. In 2012, Burton gained the sponsorship in Wheaties, BB&T and EnerSys. The 31 team also switched crew chiefs too, and Drew Blickensderfer became the crew chief. After a dismal 2012, Blickensderfer was released four races early and Luke Lambert became Burton's crew chief in 2013. Shane Wilson became interim crew chief until the end of 2012. Burton had six Top 10s in 2012, including a dramatic second-place finish at Daytona in July after saving his car from spinning on the final lap. At the AdvoCare 500 at Phoenix International Raceway, Burton would make his 1,000th career NASCAR start, the sixth driver in NASCAR history to do so.

On September 4, 2013, Richard Childress Racing announced that Burton would not be returning to RCR in 2014. On November 8, Burton stated that he would run a part-time schedule in 2014. Burton later said that he wanted to stay with RCR for 2014 to transition straight from racing to television, but RCR chose to sign Ryan Newman instead.

AT&T sponsorship controversy
Cingular Wireless began its sponsorship of the No. 31 Chevrolet in the NASCAR NEXTEL Cup series prior to 2004 when NEXTEL purchased the naming rights to NASCAR's top division. Cingular and Alltel, the sponsors of Ryan Newman's No. 12 Dodge, were allowed to stay as sponsors under a grandfather clause. In early 2007, following its purchase by AT&T, Cingular began a rebranding effort to the AT&T Mobility brand. NASCAR quickly claimed that a clause in their contract with Sprint Nextel would not allow Cingular to change either the name or brand advertised on the No. 31 car.

After trying and failing to persuade NASCAR to approve the addition of the AT&T globe logo to the rear of the car, AT&T filed a lawsuit against NASCAR on March 16, 2007. On May 18, AT&T won a preliminary injunction and, following a failed emergency motion for a stay by NASCAR on May 19, rebranded the No. 31 car in time for the Nextel All-Star Challenge that evening. NASCAR was later granted an appeal to be heard on August 2.

On June 17, NASCAR announced it had filed a $100 million lawsuit against AT&T and would like AT&T and all other telecommunications companies out of the sport in 2008. The other rival company involved, Alltel, was in the process of being sold.

On August 13, a ruling by a federal appeals court cleared the way for NASCAR to prevent AT&T, Inc. from featuring its logo on Burton's No. 31 Richard Childress Racing Chevrolet.
The court, therefore, threw out a lower court's ruling that prevented NASCAR from stopping AT&T's plans. The appeals court remanded the case to the U.S. District Court in Atlanta.

At first practice for the Sharpie 500 at Bristol Motor Speedway on August 24, the No. 31 car had no AT&T branding, but the familiar orange and black paint scheme. Burton's pit crew wore grey Richard Childress Racing shirts and Burton wore a plain orange fire suit displaying only small associate sponsor logos. The car arrived in a black hauler with only the number 31 on the side. NASCAR officials said the car would not have made it through inspection with the AT&T logos.

On September 7, 2007, NASCAR announced that an agreement had been reached between Sprint Nextel and Richard Childress Racing which would allow AT&T to sponsor the No. 31 car through the end of the 2008 season. Under the terms of the agreement Burton was required to find a new sponsor by 2009. On June 18, 2008, it was announced that RCR had secured sponsorship for the 31 of Burton. Caterpillar, which previously spent 10 years on the No. 22 of Bill Davis Racing and with Jeff's brother Ward driving from 1999 to 2003, signed a multi-year agreement with Richard Childress Racing to become the new primary sponsor of the 31 starting in 2009.

2014–2015: Part-time racer and move to television

NBC Sports
On December 3, 2013, NBC Sports Network producer Sam Flood announced that Burton would become an analyst for NBC in 2015.

Michael Waltrip Racing
On December 2, 2013, it was announced that Burton had been hired by Michael Waltrip Racing to run a limited schedule for MWR's research-and-development team, Identity Ventures Racing. Burton made his debut in the No. 66 at Las Vegas.

Prior to Burton's scheduled start at Michigan, it was announced he would be replaced as R&D driver by Brett Moffitt, though he would be given one more start at Loudon, which was expected to be his final career race.

Stewart-Haas Racing
However, on August 14, 2014, Burton was picked up by Stewart-Haas Racing to replace Tony Stewart in the No. 14 at the Pure Michigan 400 and the Irwin Tools Night Race, in the aftermath of the death of sprint car driver Kevin Ward Jr.

Business ventures
On January 9, 2023, a consortium consisting of Jeff Burton Autosports, Inc., DEJ Management, Kevin Harvick Incorporated, and Trackhouse Racing Team purchased the CARS Tour.

Personal life
Burton is the younger brother of Ward Burton, who is a former Cup Series driver.  Married to wife Kim, they have two children: Paige and Harrison. Harrison, like his father, is a NASCAR driver, and currently races in the Cup Series. Burton also has another brother, Brian, who did not drive in NASCAR but rather took over the family's construction business. Burton currently resides in Huntersville, North Carolina.

Burton's family ancestry can be traced back through Colonial Virginia where the landing of his earliest ancestor Richard Burton came over to the Jamestown Colony in the 1630s. The earliest his ancestry goes is back to the 1200s with his ancestor Rodger de Burghton.

Burton is a fan of Bruce Lee. At the Coca-Cola 500 at Twin Ring Motegi in Japan, he raced a special Bruce Lee paint scheme on his No. 99 Ford.

Motorsports career results

NASCAR
(key) (Bold – Pole position awarded by qualifying time. Italics – Pole position earned by points standings or practice time. * – Most laps led ** – All laps led.)

Sprint Cup Series

Daytona 500

Nationwide Series

Craftsman Truck Series

 Season still in progress
 Ineligible for series points

International Race of Champions
(key) (Bold – Pole position. * – Most laps led.)

References

External links

 
 
 Jeff Burton at The Coca-Cola Racing Family

Living people
1967 births
People from South Boston, Virginia
Racing drivers from Virginia
NASCAR drivers
International Race of Champions drivers
AT&T people
Caterpillar Inc. people
Motorsport announcers
American television sports announcers
RFK Racing drivers
Richard Childress Racing drivers
Michael Waltrip Racing drivers
Stewart-Haas Racing drivers
Lamborghini Squadra Corse drivers